Eziama may refer to one of several populated places in Nigeria:

NOTE:  GEOnet and GEOnetdab UFI links currently "broken" (NGA change?);
GEOnet2 G_NAME/Name_GUID links currently work.

See also
 Eziama, Imo, Nigeria (a town)